Christopher Sterling Scott (born December 11, 1961) is a former American football defensive end who played three seasons with the Indianapolis Colts of the National Football League (NFL). He was drafted by the Colts in the third round of the 1984 NFL Draft. He played college football at Purdue University and attended Berea High School in Berea, Ohio.

References

External links
Just Sports Stats

1961 births
Living people
People from Berea, Ohio
Players of American football from Ohio
African-American players of American football
American football defensive ends
Purdue Boilermakers football players
Indianapolis Colts players
National Football League replacement players
21st-century African-American people
20th-century African-American sportspeople